Noël-Antoine Pierre (born 23 June 1995) is a French pair skater. With his former skating partner, Coline Keriven, he is a four-time French national medalist (2018, 2020–22) and the 2018 Volvo Open Cup bronze medalist. They competed in the final segment at the 2020 European Championships.

As a singles skater, he is the 2012 French junior national champion, the 2012 Bavarian Open junior champion, and the 2013 Denkova-Staviski Cup bronze medalist.

Programs

Competitive highlights 
CS: Challenger Series

With Keriven

Men's singles

References

External links 
 

1995 births
French male pair skaters
Living people
Sportspeople from Isère